Trachys is a genus of beetles in the family Buprestidae, containing the following species:

Species

 Trachys abeillei Obenberger, 1940
 Trachys abietis Kerremans, 1903
 Trachys abyssinicus Théry, 1927
 Trachys acaliphae Théry, 1947
 Trachys aeneiceps Obenberger, 1929
 Trachys aeneocephalus Fisher, 1930
 Trachys aenescens Kerremans, 1892
 Trachys aequalipennis Obenberger, 1921
 Trachys aequalis Kerremans, 1900
 Trachys africanus Kerremans, 1903
 Trachys agatha Obenberger, 1937
 Trachys agitosus Obenberger, 1937
 Trachys ahenatus Mulsant & Rey, 1863
 Trachys alberti Kerremans, 1912
 Trachys albolineatus Kerremans, 1912
 Trachys allectus Kerremans, 1914
 Trachys alluaudi Kerremans, 1894
 Trachys alongensis Descarpentries & Villiers, 1965
 Trachys alpinus Obenberger, 1918
 Trachys althaeus Obenberger, 1929
 Trachys althasius Obenberger, 1937
 Trachys alticolus Cobos, 1966
 Trachys ambiguus Descarpentries & Villiers, 1965
 Trachys ambrosus Kerremans, 1894
 Trachys amiartus Obenberger, 1938
 Trachys amplus Roubal, 1920
 Trachys andrewesi Kerremans, 1893
 Trachys andromedus Obenberger, 1929
 Trachys angolensis Théry, 1947
 Trachys anthraorus Obenberger, 1937
 Trachys anthrenoides Thomson, 1879
 Trachys antistes Obenberger, 1937
 Trachys aone Obenberger, 1929
 Trachys apicalis van de Poll, 1887
 Trachys apollonius Obenberger, 1929
 Trachys araxicolus Obenberger, 1918
 Trachys areroensis Obenberger, 1940
 Trachys argenteosparsus Théry, 1898
 Trachys argentipilis Obenberger, 1930
 Trachys argyronetus Obenberger, 1930
 Trachys arhemus Obenberger, 1929
 Trachys ariaxis Obenberger, 1937
 Trachys aristaeus Obenberger, 1929
 Trachys aristomache Obenberger, 1929
 Trachys armaeone Obenberger, 1937
 Trachys armillus Obenberger, 1937
 Trachys artaoxus Obenberger, 1937
 Trachys arxus Obenberger, 1937
 Trachys asiaticus Kerremans, 1900
 Trachys assinicus Kerremans, 1903
 Trachys astarte Obenberger, 1929
 Trachys asterius Obenberger, 1929
 Trachys atra Kerremans, 1893
 Trachys auricollis Saunders, 1873
 Trachys auriferus Cobos, 1959
 Trachys aurifluus Solsky, 1875
 Trachys auropictus Kerremans, 1912
 Trachys azureus Deyrolle, 1864
 Trachys bacchus Obenberger, 1929
 Trachys bakeri Kerremans, 1914
 Trachys bali Guérin-Méneville, 1840
 Trachys barbatulus Obenberger, 1937
 Trachys barbieri Descarpentries & Villiers, 1966
 Trachys barnevillei Tournier, 1868
 Trachys bathyllus Obenberger, 1929
 Trachys batoerradinis Fisher, 1935
 Trachys baudoni Descarpentries & Villiers, 1966
 Trachys baumiellus Obenberger, 1937
 Trachys bedfordi Théry, 1929
 Trachys bellicosus Théry, 1904
 Trachys bellonus Obenberger, 1929
 Trachys bellus Kerremans, 1894
 Trachys bequaerti Kerremans, 1912
 Trachys bettotanus Fisher, 1930
 Trachys bicolor Kerremans, 1890
 Trachys bicoloritarsis Descarpentries & Villiers, 1966
 Trachys binhensis Descarpentries & Villiers, 1965
 Trachys blackburni Kerremans, 1896
 Trachys blairi Obenberger, 1929
 Trachys blaisei Obenberger, 1921
 Trachys blandulus Obenberger, 1937
 Trachys blaoensis Descarpentries & Villiers, 1966
 Trachys bodenheimeri Théry, 1934
 Trachys boerus Obenberger, 1937
 Trachys boettcheri Obenberger, 1924
 Trachys bolivari Obenberger, 1921
 Trachys borneensis Kerremans, 1900
 Trachys bos Descarpentries & Villiers, 1966
 Trachys brasiliae Obenberger, 1924
 Trachys brevior Fairmaire, 1901
 Trachys brevis Théry, 1948
 Trachys brideliae Cobos, 1958
 Trachys bronzeus Cobos, 1959
 Trachys broussonetiae Kurosawa, 1985
 Trachys bruneianus Kerremans, 1900
 Trachys buffoni Descarpentries & Villiers, 1966
 Trachys calais Obenberger, 1929
 Trachys calopogoniae Théry, 1937
 Trachys cambouei Théry, 1905
 Trachys canescens Cobos, 1959
 Trachys capeneri Cobos, 1952
 Trachys capicolus Obenberger, 1937
 Trachys carbonarius Deyrolle, 1864
 Trachys carmentis Obenberger, 1929
 Trachys carus Kerremans, 1914
 Trachys cassiae Obenberger, 1937
 Trachys ceballosi Cobos, 1959
 Trachys centrimaculatus Théry, 1904
 Trachys ceylonicus Obenberger, 1916
 Trachys chembanus Théry, 1934
 Trachys chinensis Kerremans, 1898
 Trachys cicutus Obenberger, 1930
 Trachys cinctus Kerremans, 1900
 Trachys cinereoirroratus Motschulsky, 1861
 Trachys circumdatus Kerremans, 1908
 Trachys clathriferus Obenberger, 1937
 Trachys cleopatra Obenberger, 1930
 Trachys cochinchinae Descarpentries, 1958
 Trachys coelicolor Cobos, 1959
 Trachys collarti Théry, 1948
 Trachys commixtus Thomson, 1879
 Trachys compactus Théry, 1905
 Trachys confusissimus Obenberger, 1925
 Trachys confusulus Obenberger, 1928
 Trachys consimilis Kerremans, 1894
 Trachys contextus Obenberger, 1937
 Trachys coracinus Fåhraeus in Boheman, 1851
 Trachys corculus Théry, 1905
 Trachys corinnus Théry, 1905
 Trachys corporaali Obenberger, 1924
 Trachys coryphaeus Obenberger, 1937
 Trachys crassatus Obenberger, 1937
 Trachys crassulus Fairmaire, 1903
 Trachys credulus Kerremans, 1914
 Trachys creon Théry, 1905
 Trachys csikii Pochon, 1965
 Trachys cuneatus Fairmaire, 1903
 Trachys cuneiferus Kurosawa, 1959
 Trachys cupricolor Saunders, 1873
 Trachys cupripygus Deyrolle, 1864
 Trachys curius Obenberger, 1929
 Trachys cuvieri Descarpentries & Villiers, 1966
 Trachys cyaneus Théry, 1948
 Trachys cyanipennis Fisher, 1921
 Trachys cyanurus Kerremans, 1900
 Trachys cybele Obenberger, 1929
 Trachys cythaeris Obenberger, 1937
 Trachys dabalthus Obenberger, 1937
 Trachys dabraxus Obenberger, 1937
 Trachys daghmus Obenberger, 1937
 Trachys dalaraeus Obenberger, 1937
 Trachys damarigenus Obenberger, 1937
 Trachys danae Obenberger, 1929
 Trachys daoensis Descarpentries & Villiers, 1965
 Trachys daphnaeus Obenberger, 1937
 Trachys dapitanus Obenberger, 1924
 Trachys darlingtoni Théry, 1937
 Trachys darnothus Obenberger, 1937
 Trachys darwini Descarpentries & Villiers, 1966
 Trachys dasi Théry, 1947
 Trachys dasytrichus Obenberger, 1937
 Trachys davidis Fairmaire, 1888
 Trachys decorsei Théry, 1905
 Trachys deditus Théry, 1905
 Trachys dejectus Kerremans, 1900
 Trachys deliae Théry, 1905
 Trachys denti Théry, 1941
 Trachys denudatus Ritsema, 1879
 Trachys dessumi Descarpentries & Villiers, 1965
 Trachys deyrollei Fisher, 1926
 Trachys dichrous Obenberger, 1918
 Trachys dictynnus Obenberger, 1937
 Trachys dido Obenberger, 1930
 Trachys differens Kerremans, 1903
 Trachys dilaticeps Gebhardt, 1928
 Trachys dirus Théry, 1905
 Trachys discalis Kerremans, 1912
 Trachys divaricatus Cobos, 1952
 Trachys divergens Kerremans, 1893
 Trachys dives Théry, 1955
 Trachys dolabellus Obenberger, 1929
 Trachys dolomedeus Obenberger, 1937
 Trachys downingi Obenberger, 1929
 Trachys drescheri Fisher, 1935
 Trachys dubius Saunders, 1874
 Trachys dughbarus Obenberger, 1937
 Trachys dummeri Théry, 1928
 Trachys duplofasciatus Gebhardt, 1928
 Trachys duvivieri Kerremans, 1892
 Trachys earias Obenberger, 1937
 Trachys echo Obenberger, 1929
 Trachys eclogus Obenberger, 1937
 Trachys electrus Obenberger, 1929
 Trachys elegans Gestro, 1877
 Trachys elgus Obenberger, 1929
 Trachys eliminatus Obenberger, 1937
 Trachys elvira Obenberger, 1929
 Trachys epischius Obenberger, 1937
 Trachys erastrius Obenberger, 1937
 Trachys erogatus Obenberger, 1937
 Trachys erraticus Kerremans, 1903
 Trachys eruditsua Obenberger, 1937
 Trachys erythreae Obenberger, 1937
 Trachys eryx Obenberger, 1929
 Trachys escalerai Cobos, 1959
 Trachys eschscholtzi Obenberger, 1924
 Trachys eucyaneus Obenberger, 1937
 Trachys eurycephalus Obenberger, 1937
 Trachys eurynome Obenberger, 1929
 Trachys euterpe Obenberger, 1929
 Trachys evanescens Fåhraeus in Boheman, 1851
 Trachys excavatus Kerremans, 1893
 Trachys exilis Kerremans, 1894
 Trachys exmiaris Obenberger, 1937
 Trachys exsculptus Kerremans, 1894
 Trachys fairmairei Kerremans, 1903
 Trachys fallax Kerremans, 1893
 Trachys fasciunculus Saunders, 1866
 Trachys fenestrellus Obenberger, 1937
 Trachys fidens Kerremans, 1903
 Trachys fischeri Théry, 1905
 Trachys fisheri Obenberger, 1924
 Trachys flaviceps Kerremans, 1892
 Trachys flavius Obenberger, 1929
 Trachys fleutiauxi van de Poll, 1892
 Trachys fluviatilis Kerremans, 1896
 Trachys foliivorus Obenberger, 1937
 Trachys formosanus Kerremans, 1912
 Trachys fragariae Brisout de Barneville, 1874
 Trachys francisci Descarpentries & Villiers, 1966
 Trachys furius Obenberger, 1929
 Trachys furnius Obenberger, 1930
 Trachys gabbalus Obenberger, 1937
 Trachys gambianus Obenberger, 1937
 Trachys gapi Obenberger, 1929
 Trachys garuus Obenberger, 1937
 Trachys gasurrus Obenberger, 1937
 Trachys gedyei Théry, 1941
 Trachys gerardi Obenberger, 1937
 Trachys gestroanus Obenberger, 1924
 Trachys gilli Obenberger, 1937
 Trachys giubbanus Obenberger, 1937
 Trachys globosus Kerremans, 1896
 Trachys goberti Gozis, 1889
 Trachys grandiceps Théry, 1905
 Trachys grandidieri Théry, 1937
 Trachys gravidus Kerremans, 1900
 Trachys griseofasciatus Saunders, 1873
 Trachys habrolomoides Descarpentries & Villiers, 1966
 Trachys harmandi Descarpentries & Villiers, 1965
 Trachys helena Obenberger, 1929
 Trachys helferi Obenberger, 1918
 Trachys helferianus Cobos, 1957
 Trachys heliochaerus Obenberger, 1937
 Trachys heliomachus Obenberger, 1929
 Trachys hera Obenberger, 1929
 Trachys herillus Obenberger, 1929
 Trachys hermione Obenberger, 1929
 Trachys hessei Obenberger, 1937
 Trachys hipponensis Marseul, 1866
 Trachys hoaensis Descarpentries & Villiers, 1966
 Trachys horni Théry, 1904
 Trachys hornianus Obenberger, 1918
 Trachys horvathi Pochon, 1965
 Trachys houskai Obenberger, 1946
 Trachys hylophilus Obenberger, 1937
 Trachys hypsipile Obenberger, 1929
 Trachys hyrcaeus Obenberger, 1929
 Trachys ida Obenberger, 1929
 Trachys immotus Théry, 1905
 Trachys imperatrix Kerremans, 1894
 Trachys impressus Boheman, 1858
 Trachys incertus Fåhraeus in Boheman, 1851
 Trachys inconspicuus Saunders, 1873
 Trachys indrus Obenberger, 1929
 Trachys ine Obenberger, 1918
 Trachys ineditus Saunders, 1873
 Trachys insulicolus Fisher, 1935
 Trachys ioccosulus Obenberger, 1937
 Trachys iphitheus Obenberger, 1937
 Trachys ipomeaeus Théry, 1930
 Trachys isabellae Obenberger, 1921
 Trachys isis Obenberger, 1937
 Trachys isolatus Obenberger, 1924
 Trachys jacobi Théry, 1927
 Trachys jakobsoni Obenberger, 1929
 Trachys janthe Obenberger, 1929
 Trachys jeanneli Kerremans, 1914
 Trachys jeannelianus Descarpentries & Villiers, 1966
 Trachys jo Obenberger, 1918
 Trachys judith Obenberger, 1929
 Trachys juno Obenberger, 1918
 Trachys junodella Théry, 1938
 Trachys junodi Obenberger, 1937
 Trachys juvenilis Kerremans, 1903
 Trachys kalshoveni Fisher, 1935
 Trachys kaszabi Pochon, 1965
 Trachys kikuyinus Obenberger, 1928
 Trachys kittenbergeri Pochon, 1965
 Trachys kivuensis Théry, 1948
 Trachys klapaleki Obenberger, 1930
 Trachys kocheri Baudon, 1958
 Trachys koenigi Reitter, 1890
 Trachys koshunensis Obenberger, 1940
 Trachys kraatzi Kerremans, 1899
 Trachys krakatoanus Obenberger, 1929
 Trachys kurosawai Bellamy, 2004
 Trachys lacthoensis Descarpentries & Villiers, 1966
 Trachys lagalus Cobos, 1963
 Trachys lakshmi Obenberger, 1937
 Trachys lamarcki Descarpentries & Villiers, 1966
 Trachys lameerei Kerremans, 1912
 Trachys lao Descarpentries & Villiers, 1966
 Trachys laoticus Baudon, 1962
 Trachys latifrons Kerremans, 1907
 Trachys latreillei Descarpentries & Villiers, 1966
 Trachys laurencii Obenberger, 1937
 Trachys lavinius Obenberger, 1937
 Trachys layus Obenberger, 1952
 Trachys lembanus Kerremans, 1912
 Trachys lenus Obenberger, 1937
 Trachys lesnei Théry, 1934
 Trachys leucippe Obenberger, 1930
 Trachys leuctrius Obenberger, 1937
 Trachys levipennis Kerremans, 1903
 Trachys libanonicus Obenberger, 1937
 Trachys libitinus Obenberger, 1930
 Trachys lichtensteini Buysson, 1918
 Trachys lithus Obenberger, 1937
 Trachys livius Obenberger, 1937
 Trachys lucia Obenberger, 1937
 Trachys lucidulus Fåhraeus in Boheman, 1851
 Trachys lunatus Fisher, 1921
 Trachys luxuriosus Obenberger, 1937
 Trachys luzonicus Kerremans, 1900
 Trachys lyrus Kerremans, 1892
 Trachys macrocephalus Cobos, 1957
 Trachys maculatus Kerremans, 1894
 Trachys madurensis Obenberger, 1921
 Trachys magnificus Kerremans, 1894
 Trachys maia Obenberger, 1929
 Trachys malignus Obenberger, 1937
 Trachys mandarinus Obenberger, 1917
 Trachys manilius Obenberger, 1930
 Trachys mansueta Kerremans, 1894
 Trachys mariaxis Obenberger, 1937
 Trachys marineanus Obenberger, 1930
 Trachys marmoratus Fisher, 1921
 Trachys marogis Obenberger, 1937
 Trachys marshalli Théry, 1931
 Trachys mateui Cobos, 1954
 Trachys mathaba Bellamy, 1998
 Trachys matronus Obenberger, 1937
 Trachys maxaphus Obenberger, 1937
 Trachys medianus Fairmaire, 1903
 Trachys megacephalus Descarpentries & Villiers, 1965
 Trachys melliculus Deyrolle, 1864
 Trachys mendicus Deyrolle, 1864
 Trachys menthae Bedel, 1921
 Trachys meo Descarpentries & Villiers, 1966
 Trachys meridianus Obenberger, 1937
 Trachys miargus Obenberger, 1937
 Trachys micans Obenberger, 1937
 Trachys micros Fairmaire, 1901
 Trachys minimus (Wiedemann, 1823)
 Trachys minor Théry, 1947
 Trachys minutus (Linnaeus, 1758)
 Trachys misanthrus Obenberger, 1937
 Trachys mixiorus Obenberger, 1937
 Trachys mixtipilis Obenberger, 1929
 Trachys moi Descarpentries & Villiers, 1965
 Trachys montanus Kerremans, 1908
 Trachys moralesi Cobos, 1959
 Trachys morenoi Cobos, 1958
 Trachys mouhoti Descarpentries & Villiers, 1966
 Trachys moultoni Kerremans, 1912
 Trachys muelleri Obenberger, 1940
 Trachys mundamus Obenberger, 1937
 Trachys muong Descarpentries & Villiers, 1966
 Trachys mystaxidorus Obenberger, 1937
 Trachys nairobiensis Théry, 1941
 Trachys namensis Descarpentries & Villiers, 1965
 Trachys namithrus Obenberger, 1937
 Trachys nanubis Obenberger, 1937
 Trachys natalesianus Cobos, 1952
 Trachys natalicus Obenberger, 1937
 Trachys nathani Cobos, 1957
 Trachys nauticus Obenberger, 1937
 Trachys nemethi Théry, 1928
 Trachys ngongensis Théry, 1941
 Trachys nickerli Obenberger, 1924
 Trachys nigerellus Obenberger, 1935
 Trachys niobae Théry, 1905
 Trachys nitidus Kerremans, 1893
 Trachys noarche Obenberger, 1930
 Trachys nodulipennis Obenberger, 1940
 Trachys nomas Obenberger, 1937
 Trachys novellus Obenberger, 1937
 Trachys novicius Obenberger, 1937
 Trachys novus Kerremans, 1894
 Trachys nudus Abeille de Perrin, 1893
 Trachys obesulus Obenberger, 1918
 Trachys obesus Kerremans, 1900
 Trachys obliquus Kerremans, 1892
 Trachys obscurus Kerremans, 1896
 Trachys occisus Kerremans, 1903
 Trachys ocellipunctatus Fisher, 1926
 Trachys ohbayashii Kurosawa, 1954
 Trachys olifantinus Obenberger, 1939
 Trachys olmyrus Obenberger, 1929
 Trachys olyrus Obenberger, 1929
 Trachys oncoxius Obenberger, 1929
 Trachys opulentus Abeille de Perrin, 1893
 Trachys orcas Obenberger, 1930
 Trachys orientalis Thomson, 1879
 Trachys ovatus Fisher, 1921
 Trachys ovis Kerremans, 1908
 Trachys pacificus Kerremans, 1894
 Trachys paklayanus Descarpentries & Villiers, 1966
 Trachys paphne Obenberger, 1937
 Trachys parallelus Kerremans, 1898
 Trachys parvulus Kerremans, 1893
 Trachys patrizianus Théry, 1927
 Trachys patronus Obenberger, 1937
 Trachys pecirkai Obenberger, 1926
 Trachys penarius Obenberger, 1937
 Trachys pendleburyi Fisher, 1930
 Trachys penicillatus Kerremans, 1892
 Trachys percautus Kerremans, 1903
 Trachys perparvus Obenberger, 1918
 Trachys perrieri Fairmaire, 1901
 Trachys perroti Descarpentries & Villiers, 1965
 Trachys perrotianus Descarpentries & Villiers, 1965
 Trachys pertoldi Obenberger, 1929
 Trachys phaedaenus Obenberger, 1937
 Trachys phanerogaea Obenberger, 1937
 Trachys pharameis Obenberger, 1937
 Trachys pharaxis Obenberger, 1937
 Trachys philomelus Obenberger, 1937
 Trachys phlyctaenoides Kolenati, 1846
 Trachys phoebe Obenberger, 1930
 Trachys piceiventris Fisher, 1921
 Trachys pictus Fisher, 1921
 Trachys pilosulus Kerremans, 1893
 Trachys pipturi Fisher, 1937
 Trachys plausibilis Obenberger, 1937
 Trachys plebejus Kerremans, 1894
 Trachys pollentius Obenberger, 1929
 Trachys polyhymnius Obenberger, 1929
 Trachys polyxenus Obenberger, 1937
 Trachys pomonus Obenberger, 1937
 Trachys popilius Obenberger, 1929
 Trachys porcius Obenberger, 1937
 Trachys posticalis Fairmaire, 1903
 Trachys praocris Obenberger, 1937
 Trachys princeps Saunders, 1874
 Trachys proagorus Obenberger, 1937
 Trachys problematicus Obenberger, 1918
 Trachys procris Obenberger, 1937
 Trachys proculeius Obenberger, 1937
 Trachys proflatus Obenberger, 1937
 Trachys prolongatulus Obenberger, 1937
 Trachys proserpinus Obenberger, 1929
 Trachys psecas Obenberger, 1937
 Trachys pseuderato Descarpentries & Villiers, 1966
 Trachys pseudolyrus Descarpentries & Villiers, 1965
 Trachys pseudoscrobiculatus Obenberger, 1940
 Trachys puberulus Fåhraeus in Boheman, 1851
 Trachys pulex Obenberger, 1937
 Trachys pullus Obenberger, 1937
 Trachys pumilus (Illiger, 1803)
 Trachys puncticollis Abeille de Perrin, 1900
 Trachys purpuridorsis Obenberger, 1937
 Trachys pyrameis Obenberger, 1937
 Trachys quercicolus Marseul, 1871
 Trachys racilius Obenberger, 1937
 Trachys ramisinus Obenberger, 1928
 Trachys reflexus Gené, 1839
 Trachys regius Kerremans, 1914
 Trachys regularis Cobos, 1959
 Trachys reitteri Obenberger, 1930
 Trachys resupinans Obenberger, 1937
 Trachys rhexinius Obenberger, 1937
 Trachys riparius Kerremans, 1913
 Trachys rita Obenberger, 1937
 Trachys rivularis Obenberger, 1937
 Trachys robustus Saunders, 1873
 Trachys rotundatus Kerremans, 1893
 Trachys rufescens Kerremans, 1892
 Trachys rufopubens Fairmaire, 1888
 Trachys ruralis Obenberger, 1937
 Trachys rwindiensis Théry, 1948
 Trachys sabirrus Obenberger, 1937
 Trachys sagus Obenberger, 1937
 Trachys saigonensis Descarpentries, 1958
 Trachys sakaliani Bellamy, 2004
 Trachys salpius Obenberger, 1937
 Trachys saltzi Bellamy, 1999
 Trachys salvazai Descarpentries & Villiers, 1966
 Trachys sanguinipilis Descarpentries & Villiers, 1966
 Trachys satanas Descarpentries & Villiers, 1965
 Trachys saundersi Lewis, 1893
 Trachys schoutedeni Kerremans, 1912
 Trachys schultzei Kerremans, 1907
 Trachys scriptellus Obenberger, 1924
 Trachys scrobiculatus Kiesenwetter, 1857
 Trachys scyrrhaeus Obenberger, 1937
 Trachys sebakwensis Obenberger, 1937
 Trachys segundus Bellamy, 1996
 Trachys sellatus Fairmaire, 1901
 Trachys semen Théry, 1937
 Trachys semiramis Obenberger, 1929
 Trachys sempronius Obenberger, 1937
 Trachys senegalensis Gory, 1841
 Trachys serapis Obenberger, 1929
 Trachys sibitiensis Descarpentries, 1970
 Trachys sibylla Obenberger, 1937
 Trachys sicardi Théry, 1905
 Trachys signatus Kerremans, 1896
 Trachys silius Obenberger, 1929
 Trachys simbus Obenberger, 1937
 Trachys simoni Kerremans, 1903
 Trachys simulans Kerremans, 1893
 Trachys sinicus Obenberger, 1929
 Trachys sjoestedti Kerremans, 1908
 Trachys solarius Obenberger, 1937
 Trachys solitarius Kerremans, 1894
 Trachys solivagus Obenberger, 1937
 Trachys somalus Gestro, 1895
 Trachys sordidulus Obenberger, 1918
 Trachys sororculus Obenberger, 1929
 Trachys sparsutus Kerremans, 1900
 Trachys spectatrix Obenberger, 1937
 Trachys spectrus Théry, 1905
 Trachys sphaxus Obenberger, 1937
 Trachys splendidulus Reitter, 1890
 Trachys staudingeri Théry, 1932
 Trachys sternax Obenberger, 1937
 Trachys straeleni Théry, 1948
 Trachys stricticollis Descarpentries & Villiers, 1965
 Trachys suarezi Cobos, 1958
 Trachys subaeneellus Obenberger, 1924
 Trachys subcorpulentus Descarpentries & Villiers, 1965
 Trachys subglabrus Rey, 1891
 Trachys subviolaceus Kerremans, 1892
 Trachys sumbawanus Kerremans, 1898
 Trachys suspectatrix Obenberger, 1918
 Trachys sussamyrensis Obenberger, 1937
 Trachys swiertsrae Obenberger, 1937
 Trachys tagalus Cobos, 1963
 Trachys taiwanensis Obenberger, 1929
 Trachys tamensis Descarpentries & Villiers, 1966
 Trachys tavetanus Kerremans, 1913
 Trachys taxillus Obenberger, 1937
 Trachys tenuis Obenberger, 1937
 Trachys thais Obenberger, 1929
 Trachys theochaerus Obenberger, 1937
 Trachys thoracicus Kerremans, 1912
 Trachys tiburtius Obenberger, 1937
 Trachys timidus Fåhraeus in Boheman, 1851
 Trachys tiwianus Obenberger, 1928
 Trachys tokyoensis Obenberger, 1940
 Trachys tonkineus Obenberger, 1921
 Trachys toringoi Kurosawa, 1951
 Trachys torridus Thomson, 1879
 Trachys transversus Kerremans, 1892
 Trachys tristiculus Obenberger, 1918
 Trachys tristis Abeille de Perrin, 1900
 Trachys troglodytes Gyllenhal in Schönherr, 1817
 Trachys troglodytiformis Obenberger, 1918
 Trachys tschoffeni Kerremans, 1896
 Trachys tsushimae Obenberger, 1922
 Trachys turanicus Semenov, 1893
 Trachys ugandicus Obenberger, 1937
 Trachys ukerewensis Obenberger, 1937
 Trachys umbrosus Kerremans, 1894
 Trachys undulatus Deyrolle, 1864
 Trachys usambarae Obenberger, 1937
 Trachys valverdei Cobos, 1958
 Trachys vandenplasi Obenberger, 1937
 Trachys vanrooni Obenberger, 1930
 Trachys varii Cobos, 1958
 Trachys variolaris Saunders, 1873
 Trachys variolipennis Cobos, 1963
 Trachys varius Deyrolle, 1864
 Trachys vaulogeri Abeille de Perrin, 1900
 Trachys vavrai Obenberger, 1918
 Trachys ventricosus Deyrolle, 1864
 Trachys vermiculatus Kerremans, 1900
 Trachys vernus Kerremans, 1900
 Trachys vicarians Obenberger, 1918
 Trachys vientianensis Descarpentries & Villiers, 1966
 Trachys villiersi Descarpentries, 1952
 Trachys violae Kurosawa, 1959
 Trachys virescens Kerremans, 1892
 Trachys viridis Samouelle, 1819
 Trachys viridulus Kerremans, 1892
 Trachys welwitschi Théry, 1947
 Trachys wittei Théry, 1948
 Trachys xampethis Obenberger, 1937
 Trachys xanthe Obenberger, 1937
 Trachys xauarius Obenberger, 1937
 Trachys xenarthrus Obenberger, 1937
 Trachys xenius Obenberger, 1929
 Trachys xenonymus Obenberger, 1937
 Trachys xiengensis Descarpentries & Villiers, 1966
 Trachys xithris Obenberger, 1937
 Trachys yanoi Kurosawa, 1959
 Trachys yoshidai Kurosawa, 1959
 Trachys zaghrus Obenberger, 1937
 Trachys zambesicus Obenberger, 1937
 Trachys zanzibaricus Kerremans, 1896
 Trachys zaroghus Obenberger, 1937
 Trachys zavattarii Obenberger, 1940
 Trachys zebrinus Deyrolle, 1864
 Trachys zethmaeus Obenberger, 1937
 Trachys ziziphusii Cobos, 1958
 Trachys zuluanus Obenberger, 1937
 Trachys zulukaffra Obenberger, 1937

References

Buprestidae genera